William Story (April 4, 1843 – June 20, 1921) was a United States district judge of the United States District Court for the Western District of Arkansas and later the seventh lieutenant governor of Colorado, serving from 1891 to 1893 under Governor of Colorado John Long Routt.

Education and career
Born in Waukesha County, Wisconsin, Story graduated from the University of Michigan in 1864. He joined the 39th Wisconsin Infantry Regiment of the Union Army as a sergeant and served from 1864 to 1865. He was in private practice in Milwaukee, Wisconsin from 1865 to 1866, and in Fayetteville, Arkansas from 1866 to 1867. He was a judge of the Circuit Court of Arkansas for the Second Judicial Circuit Court of Arkansas from 1867 to 1871, sitting as a "special chief justice" of the Arkansas Supreme Court in 1869.

Federal judicial service

Story was nominated by President Ulysses S. Grant on March 3, 1871, to the United States District Court for the Western District of Arkansas, to a new seat authorized by 16 Stat. 471. He was confirmed by the United States Senate on March 3, 1871, and received his commission the same day. His service terminated on June 17, 1874, due to his resignation.

Circumstances of his resignation

Congress investigated Story in 1874 for, among other things, inordinately large undocumented court expenditures and for allowing bail for persons convicted of capital crimes while they were awaiting sentence. 

The House committee found that Story’s testimony was “lame, disconnected and unsatisfactory.” Within the month after publication of the committee investigation and report in the Arkansas Gazette, Story resigned and moved to Denver, Colorado.

Later career and death

Story then moved to Colorado, settling first in Denver, in 1877, and then moving to Ouray. He built up a large law practice, and during his first ten years in practice he served as attorney for the City and County of Denver. He had other interests in mining, banking, building of roads and railroads (Rio Grande Southern). He served as the lieutenant governor of Colorado from 1891 to 1893. In 1913, he moved to Salt Lake City, Utah where he established a law practice, Story & Steigmeyer. He then relocated to Los Angeles, California where he died in 1921.

Note

References

Sources

External links
 

1843 births
1921 deaths
Arkansas state court judges
Chief Justices of the Arkansas Supreme Court
Colorado Republicans
Judges of the United States District Court for the Western District of Arkansas
Lawyers from Milwaukee
Lieutenant Governors of Colorado
People from Waukesha County, Wisconsin
People of Wisconsin in the American Civil War
United States federal judges appointed by Ulysses S. Grant
19th-century American judges
University of Michigan alumni
People from Ouray, Colorado
Union Army non-commissioned officers
Arkansas Republicans
Utah Republicans
California Republicans